The 2023 Campeonato Ecuatoriano de Fútbol Serie A, known as the LigaPro BET593 2023 for sponsoring purposes, is the 65th season of the Serie A, Ecuador's top tier football league, and the fifth under the management of the Liga Profesional de Fútbol del Ecuador (or LigaPro). The season began on 24 February 2023, and the fixture for the season was unveiled on 24 January 2023.

Aucas are the defending champions.

Teams
16 teams compete in the season. Macará and 9 de Octubre were relegated after finishing in the bottom two places of the aggregate table of the previous season, being replaced by the 2022 Serie B champions El Nacional and third place Libertad. El Nacional clinched promotion to the top flight with two matches to go after defeating Libertad 4–2 on 20 October 2022, whilst Libertad themselves ensured promotion in the last round played on 30 October 2022, with a 2–0 victory over Imbabura and a 1–1 draw for América de Quito against Independiente Juniors. Despite having finished in third place in Serie B, Libertad were promoted to the top flight since runners-up Independiente Juniors are Independiente del Valle's reserve team. El Nacional returned to Serie A after two seasons, and Libertad will compete in Serie A for the first time ever.

Stadia and locations

Personnel and kits

Managerial changes

First stage
The first stage began on 24 February 2023.

Standings

Results

Top scorers

Source: Ecuagol

==References==

External links
 LigaPro's official website
 Ecuadorian Football Federation

A
E
Ecuador